Tewodros may refer to:

Tewodros I, Emperor of Ethiopia (1413–1414) 
Tewodros II, Emperor of Ethiopia (1818–1868)
Tewodros Bekele, trade unionist
Tewodros Kassahun, Ethiopian singer known by the stage name Teddy Afro
Tewodros Ashenafi, entrepreneur

See also
Tawadros (disambiguation)
Tadros, Christian Arab given name and surname
Tedros, Ethiopian and Eritrean name; list of people
Theodore (disambiguation)
Theodore (name)
Theodore (surname)